Kevin Howe is a retired American soccer defender who played professionally in the North American Soccer League.

Howe, along with his brother Tom, graduated from Christian Brothers College High School in St. Louis, Missouri.  He then attended Southern Illinois University-Edwardsville where he played on the men's soccer team from 1969 to 1972. In 1972, Howe was the captain of the Couger's soccer team as it won the NCAA Men's Division II Soccer Championship.  He graduated in 1974 with a bachelor's degree in psychology and was inducted into the Cougars Hall of Fame in 2009.  In 1973, Howe turned professional with the Atlanta Apollos of the North American Soccer League.  He moved to the Denver Dynamos for the 1974 and 1975 seasons.

In 2004, the St. Louis Soccer Hall of Fame inducted Howe.

References

External links
 NASL stats

Living people
Soccer players from St. Louis
American soccer players
Atlanta Chiefs players
Denver Dynamos players
North American Soccer League (1968–1984) players
SIU Edwardsville Cougars men's soccer players
Association football defenders
Year of birth missing (living people)